Sarah Liengu Etonge (born in Buea, Southwest Province, Cameroon) is a fell runner. She has won the annual Mount Cameroon Race of Hope seven times in her native Buea, in the Southwest Province. Her most recent victory came in 2005, with a time of 5:38:06. On March 12, 2005, Etonge was awarded an honorary doctorate degree in mountaineering by Professor Emeritus Lydia Luma of the Cameroon Education Corporation. In 2006, the city of Buea revealed a statue in her honor. It was only the second municipal statue constructed in Buea ever, and the first since that for Otto von Bismarck.

References

External links
Sarah Etonge interviewed on BBC Four (requires RealPlayer).
Volcanic Sprint, a 2007 documentary film featuring Sarah Etonge by Dorst MediaWorks.
Vision and Lessons from Queen Dr Sarah Liengu Etonge at Mount Cameroon Race of Hope 2007

Year of birth missing (living people)
Living people
People from Buea
Cameroonian female long-distance runners
Cameroonian mountain runners